Andrew William McAteer (born 24 April 1961) is an English former professional footballer. He played in the Football League in the late 1970s and throughout the 1980s.

Career

Preston North End
Signing as an apprentice in July 1977, McAteer turned professional a year later. He made his Preston North End debut as an 18-year-old on Boxing Day 1979 in a 3–0 home win over Shrewsbury Town. Quickly establishing himself as a tough-tackling attacking full back, McAteer didn't miss a game for the rest of the season, becoming a firm favourite with the Deepdale fans. The following season, he struggled with injury but still made 26 appearances as the club were relegated to Division Three. These were hard times for Preston, as they constantly struggled against relegation and financial ruin. McAteer, however, was a mainstay in the team making 277 appearances scoring nine goals during his first spell there.

Blackpool
In December 1986 John McGrath accepted a bid of £17,000 from local rivals Blackpool. McAteer played for the Seasiders for eighteen months. In June 1988 he was given a free transfer, mainly due to injuries. He made 47 appearances without scoring.

Return to Preston
John McGrath offered McAteer a return to Preston, in the form of a two-year deal. Injury, however, restricted him initially. On returning to fitness, a game in the reserves resulted in an over-zealous YTS opposition player coming in too hard and breaking McAteer's tibia and fibula. He subsequently had to retire from the professional game at the age of 28. In total he had played 343 games, scoring 10 goals.

Non-league
Upon leaving the full-time game, McAteer first signed, along with Oshor Williams, for Northern Premier League club Lancaster City, but new work commitments meant that he played only one game for the club.

References

1961 births
Living people
Footballers from Preston, Lancashire
English footballers
Association football fullbacks
Preston North End F.C. players
Blackpool F.C. players
Lancaster City F.C. players
English Football League players